Lebyazhye is a rural locality (a selo) in Sinelipyagovskoye Rural Settlement, Nizhnedevitsky District, Voronezh Oblast, Russia. The population was 63 as of 2010.

Geography 
Lebyazhye is located 33 km south of Nizhnedevitsk (the district's administrative centre) by road. Dmitriyevsky is the nearest rural locality.

References 

Rural localities in Nizhnedevitsky District